Sierra Ferrell (born August 3, 1988) is a singer, songwriter, and musician from West Virginia whose music incorporates elements of country, gypsy jazz, folk, and Latin styles such as tango and calypso music. After self-releasing the albums Pretty Magic Spell in 2018 and Washington by the Sea in 2019, she released Long Time Coming in 2021 with Rounder Records, to critical acclaim. Accompanying videos for singles "The Sea", "In Dreams", and "Bells of Every Chapel" (featuring Billy Strings) were uploaded to her YouTube channel in the weeks and months preceding the Long Time Coming's release.

Early life 
Sierra Ferrell was born in West Virginia. She grew up poor and lived with her single mother and one of her two siblings. This led to her spending less time with electronics and more time exploring outside. She says that despite the state's history of bluegrass music, she grew up instead on 90s music, especially grunge and punk music including Nirvana. She always expressed an interest in singing and playing music, however, including singing along to TV advert jingles as a child. In her early twenties, she adopted a nomadic lifestyle, busking up and down the country between cities such as Seattle and New Orleans. It was from the traveling musicians she met along the way that she discovered and fell in love with swing music, and she subsequently turned her love to bluegrass music, beginning to build acclaim and a fanbase as a result of her live performances. She signed to Rounder Records in 2018 for a three-album deal on the strength of these live shows.

Career

Early days and debut album Long Time Coming 
She uploaded an assortment of covers, original material and live performances on her YouTube channel before releasing her debut album. Live performances of many of the tracks which eventually appeared on her debut album can be found on YouTube - her performance of "In Dreams" on GemsOnVHS has over six million views - which helped build her a fanbase and generate hype for the album. Her first official releases for Rounder Records were the singles "Jeremiah" and "Why'd Ya Do It" in 2020 in advance of the album, and at the end of 2020 she put out a series of Christmas songs. Her debut album Long Time Coming was released in August 2021 to critical acclaim, receiving a five-star review in UK-based publication Country Music People, and a rating of 7.6/10 from Paste magazine and 7.6/10 from Pitchfork. Saving Country Music gave it 8.5/10. Varsity UK said "Long Time Coming will easily be the only album of its type emerging from the music city of Nashville this year", adding that "Sierra Ferrell shines brightest when she leans furthest into her own distinctive brand of jazz-inflected bluegrass". The album was co-produced by Gary Paczosa, and the album featured a number of well-known bluegrass musicians, including Sarah Jarosz and Billy Strings, which increased interest in Ferrell's music.
In 2022, Sierra Ferrell performed backing vocals on The Black Keys new studio album, Dropout Boogie.

References

Bluegrass musicians from West Virginia
Living people
1988 births